Monkeewrench (released later in the United Kingdom as Want to Play?), is the first novel by author team P. J. Tracy. It revolves around the search for a copycat killer, who is recreating murders found in a new computer game. It also seems that the killer is linked to the computer programmers who made the game.

This book was featured on the UK Richard & Judy show in 2005.

Reception 
Kirkus Reviews called it a "preposterous, entertaining nailbiter." Publishers Weekly wrote it had "an accelerating, unpredictable plot that combines police procedural with techno-geek-speak, an array of well-drawn characters and, most importantly, witty repartee." Entertainment Weekly praised it: "From the well-drawn, intelligent characters to the perfect pacing, Monkeewrench is that rare mystery that stays ahead of the reader."

External links
Interview with Writer Unboxed 3/07 about craft, the process of writing and editing, Monkeewrench, more.

2003 American novels
American thriller novels
American crime novels
Novels by P. J. Tracy
Anthony Award-winning works
Barry Award-winning works
Novels about serial killers
2003 debut novels

References